Šalovci is a village in the Prekmurje region in northeastern Slovenia. It is the seat of the Municipality of Šalovci. The writer Mihály Bakos was born in the village.

References

External links
Šalovci on Geopedia

Populated places in the Municipality of Šalovci